SPSP is a four-letter initialism that may refer to:
 Single-pair shortest path, in approaches to the shortest path problem
 Society for Personality and Social Psychology, an academic society for psychologists
 Sony PlayStation Portable, a handheld game console
 São Paulo, São Paulo (city, state; analogous to New York, New York)
 Sas Plus/Sas Pussy, EP by Karpe